Ethan of Athos is a 1986 science fiction novel by American author Lois McMaster Bujold. The title character is Dr. Ethan Urquhart, Chief of Biology at the Sevarin District Reproduction Centre on the planet Athos, who is sent to find out what happened to a shipment of vital ovarian tissue cultures. Set in the fictional universe of Bujold's Vorkosigan Saga, the novel mentions but does not feature her usual protagonist Miles Vorkosigan. To date, Bujold has never revisited the settings of Athos or Kline Station in her many subsequent novels, but the events of Ethan of Athos are later referred to indirectly in the novels Borders of Infinity (1989) and Cetaganda (1995).

Bujold had written her first novel Shards of Honor and its sequel The Warrior's Apprentice — both unpublished — when she wrote Ethan of Athos, a standalone work that was purposely short "because the current cargo-cult rumor amongst the wanna-be-published back then was that editors would be more likely to read a short manuscript." All three novels were subsequently sold, and published in 1986.

Bujold named Athos, a planet founded and maintained as an exclusively male-populated colony with a planetary religion and ideology supporting this single-sex structure, after the Greek Mount Athos, which has prohibited the entry of women for religious reasons since even before the ban was officially proclaimed by the Byzantine emperor Constantine Monomachos in 1046.

Ethan of Athos has been reprinted several times, and appeared in the 2001 Bujold omnibus Miles, Mystery and Mayhem alongside Cetaganda and the novella "Labyrinth". The novel was released on audio cassette in September 1999 narrated by Michael Hanson and Carol Cowan, and as a digital audiobook in March 2009 narrated by Grover Gardner.

Plot summary
Dr. Ethan Urquhart, Chief of Biology at the Sevarin District Reproduction Centre on Athos, is upset to find that his long-awaited shipment of ovarian tissue cultures from off-planet consists of an unusable mixture of dead and animal tissues. An exclusively male-populated planetary colony, continuing reproduction on Athos relies on uterine replicator technology, but the centuries-old cultures introduced by the original colonists have recently begun deteriorating into senescence. With their entire shipment purchased from the planet Jackson's Whole inexplicably consisting of genetic trash, the Population Council of Athos sends a reluctant Ethan offworld in search of a fresh batch of tissue cultures and (if possible) a refund from the original supplier, House Bharaputra. This is a very daring assignment as it means contact with women, who Athosians are taught are demonic and terrifying.

Ethan arrives at the interstellar hub of Kline Station and immediately encounters his first woman, Commander Elli Quinn, a rather unorthodox intelligence officer with the Dendarii Free Mercenary Fleet (and a subordinate of Admiral Naismith's). Though she is pleasant and even helpful, Ethan is wary of her. He is soon abducted and interrogated by military agents from Cetaganda who are seeking a fugitive named Terrence Cee as well as their own lost tissue cultures. They refuse to believe that Ethan is not an opposing intelligence operative. Elli rescues Ethan from certain execution. They become reluctant allies as Elli explains that she has actually been hired by House Bharaputra to track the Cetagandans, and for her own reasons determine what their interest is in the tissue cultures and how it relates to a secret Cetagandan research project.

Terrence approaches Ethan with a request for asylum, revealing himself to be the last survivor of a Cetagandan genetic project to create telepaths. Although his telepathy is reliable, it has a small range and can only be triggered for a short amount of time by ingesting large doses of the amino acid tyramine. Terrance’s female counterpart, Janine, had been killed in their escape, but he managed to preserve her body and transport it to Jackson's Whole, where he paid House Bharaputra to splice her genes into the ovarian cultures that were intended for Athos. Terrence had planned to also emigrate to Athos with the cultures, but had been delayed on his way to Kline Station, and is now horrified to learn that the cultures were stolen and replaced by the useless material that ultimately arrived on Athos.

The Cetagandans had tracked Terrence to Jackson's Whole; arriving after his departure, they had killed the Bharaputra researchers who had worked with him and destroyed their records. They then traced the tissue shipment to Kline Station, knowing Terrence would eventually come for it, though they have no knowledge of what happened to the original cultures and are desperate to reclaim them. Elli and Ethan manage to have the Cetagandans seized by Kline Station security, just as they discover that a minor official at the station had, for petty personal reasons, "thrown out" the Bharaputran tissue cultures that contained Janine's genes and replaced them with the useless biological material. Elli attempts to recruit Terrence for the Dendarii; he refuses, but gives Elli a small genetic sample. Meanwhile, Ethan asks Elli for (and receives) one of her ovaries to create a new tissue culture. After her departure, the original Bharaputran shipment unexpectedly turns up intact and usable, not destroyed. Ethan buys a new set of ovarian cultures from Beta Colony anyway as a cover, uses their packaging to relabel the cultures with Janine's genes, and returns with them and Terrence to Athos.

Athos
In the novel, the planet Athos is an all-male colony with a self-sustaining economy that is virtually independent of interstellar trade. Called a "monastery" planet by Bujold, it had been settled some 200 years earlier as a sanctuary away from women, who have since become mythologized as "demonic" due to the "madness" they cause in men. With the planetary religion and ideology supporting this single-sex structure, all incoming information is screened so that all references to — and images of — women are removed. Athos is remote, and physical contact with the rest of human civilization is limited to an annual interstellar census courier that brings information, supplies and the rare immigrant.

The population is sustained using uterine replicator technology. Nine reproduction centers across the planet possess an assortment of ovarian tissue cultures, and by design only male children are conceived. Through military and community service, Athosians earn "Social Duty Credits" towards reproduction. Regulations also allow for a "Designated Alternate Parent" who can earn Social Duty Credits by coparenting a partner's sons. Homosexuality is generally the norm on Athos, and while partnerships are typically romantic and sexual, some are merely mutually beneficial arrangements based on finances and child-rearing.

As much as Athosians are innately misogynistic, homophobia still exists elsewhere in the universe and is sometimes casually directed at the population of Athos.
Athos is named after the Greek Mount Athos monastery where no females, including female animals, are allowed.

Critical reception
Saying that "it would be hard to imagine a more unlikely hero for an SF adventure novel than a homosexual obstetrician," Booklist called Ethan of Athos "Bujold's third remarkable novel in a year" with "a compellingly attractive protagonist", going on to declare the novel "highly recommended for all SF collections." Noting that Ethan of Athos is nothing like Bujold's previous two books, Jo Walton wrote of the novel:

Walton also writes that "I couldn't have imagined what a feminist notion a planet of men is, and how tied up with nurturing children Athos is, accounting for the costs in a way that doesn't dismiss it as 'women’s work.'" Library Journal noted that "the plot-driven story moves swiftly and will engage SF fans of all subgenres". Nicki Gerlach of SF Site wrote, "Bujold's got an uncanny ability to create multidimensional, flawed, and loveable characters in a very short space. Even though Ethan is almost painfully naïve throughout the book, it's hard not to sympathize with him and cheer for him right from the beginning." She also praises Bujold's dialogue, which blends humor and "snarky wit" with "the action, the politics, and the emotional pathos that make up the rest of the story." Gerlach also praises Bujold's deftness at "introducing more serious topics in her fiction, without having the story become entirely about The Issues." She writes:

See also
 LGBT themes in speculative fiction
 Reproduction and pregnancy in speculative fiction
 Sex and sexuality in speculative fiction

References

External links
 

1986 American novels
1986 science fiction novels
American science fiction novels
LGBT speculative fiction novels
Novels by Lois McMaster Bujold
Novels with gay themes
Single-gender worlds
Space opera novels
Vorkosigan Saga
1980s LGBT novels
American LGBT novels
Baen Books books